Antonio Ferreira de Oliveira Junior (born 24 October 1984), often known as Ferreira, is a football defender from Brazil who plays for Cascavel.

Career
Ferreira began his career at Rio de Janeiro club, Profute Futebol Clube in Brazil. In 2004, he moved to Latvia to play for FK Jūrmala where he scored seven goals in 46 appearances. He scored four goals in the 2006 season as the club finished in 6th place. On 6 April 2007 he signed for Virslīga champions Liepājas Metalurgs. On 19 July he scored for Metalurgs in their 1–1 home draw against FC Dinamo Brest from Belarus in the UEFA Cup

On 4 January 2010, Ferreira signed a three-year contract with FC Terek Grozny. Antonio left Terek Grozny five years later on 31 December 2014, when his contract with the club expired.

In July 2015, Ferreira signed for Kazakhstan Premier League side FC Irtysh Pavlodar.

In 2016, during a 2-0 loss against Boa Esporte Clube when he was playing for Guarani, Ferreira pushed the referee to the ground after he was sent off and some of his teammates wanted to calm him down. Ferreira pushed one of his teammates and then after the linesman guarded the referee, he still wanted to hurt the referee but later was removed from the pitch.

Career statistics

Honours

Club
Liepājas Metalurgs
 Baltic League (1): 2007

References

External links
Antonio at soccerfactsuk

1984 births
Footballers from Rio de Janeiro (city)
Living people
Brazilian footballers
Association football defenders
Associação Desportiva Cabofriense players
FC Jūrmala players
FK Liepājas Metalurgs players
PFC Spartak Nalchik players
FC Akhmat Grozny players
Clube Atlético Bragantino players
FC Irtysh Pavlodar players
Mirassol Futebol Clube players
Guarani FC players
Figueirense FC players
São Bernardo Futebol Clube players
Esporte Clube Taubaté players
Associação Desportiva São Caetano players
FC Cascavel players
Latvian Higher League players
Russian Premier League players
Kazakhstan Premier League players
Campeonato Brasileiro Série C players
Campeonato Brasileiro Série B players
Campeonato Brasileiro Série D players
Campeonato Paranaense players
Brazilian expatriate footballers
Expatriate footballers in Latvia
Brazilian expatriate sportspeople in Latvia
Expatriate footballers in Russia
Brazilian expatriate sportspeople in Russia
Expatriate footballers in Kazakhstan
Brazilian expatriate sportspeople in Kazakhstan